Atabkashmas Owliad (also Romanized as Ātābḵashmas Owlīāɖ) is a village in Jamabrud Rural District, in the Central District of Damavand County, Tehran Province, Iran. At the 2006 census, its population was 72, in 19 families.

References 

Populated places in Damavand County